Bernard Orenstein (born February 5, 1931) is a Canadian-American actor, producer and screenwriter. He was the collaborator of Saul Turteltaub.

Born in Toronto, Ontario. Orenstein mostly produced and wrote for television programs with his writing partner, Saul Turteltaub, as his credits includes, That Girl, The New Dick Van Dyke Show, Kate & Allie, Sanford and Son (and its spin-offs Grady and Sanford Arms), What's Happening!!, and Love, American Style. He is currently a professor at Long Island University.

References

External links 

1931 births
Living people
Male actors from Toronto
Writers from Toronto
Canadian emigrants to the United States
American male television actors
Canadian male television actors
American television producers
American television writers
American male television writers
Long Island University faculty
20th-century American screenwriters